Qasemabad-e Olya or Qasemabad Olya may refer to:
 Qasemabad-e Olya, Fars
 Qasemabad-e Olya, Gilan
 Qasemabad-e Olya, Markazi